Yaxley is a small village just west of Eye in Suffolk, England. The name means 'cuckoo-clearing'.

Church of St. Mary
Pevsner describes the north porch of the 12th-century church as 'one of the most swagger in Suffolk'.

Inside the church are the remnants of a large medieval doom painting and high on the wall above the door hangs a Sexton's Wheel. This curious survival, is a device consisting of two wheels, 2 feet 8 inches in diameter, revolving on a single axle. Many theories have been proposed for use of the wheels, including the idea that they were used purely as ornaments for church doors. It has also been suggested that those wishing to fast, in honour of the Virgin Mary, from one of the six Lady Days, could choose one at random by catching one of six strings attached to named spokes. It was the Sexton who would set the two wheels revolving. The only other example in the country is claimed to be at Long Stratton in Norfolk

Local houses

Ashton Cottage in Church Lane, once the village school, was for many years the home of choreographer Frederick Ashton. He lived in Valley Farm House on Old Ipswich Road, until recently a property of the Henniker-Major family.

16th-century Yaxley Hall is a Grade II* listed building. It has a fanciful Gothick facade and, according to Pevsner, 'a composite picture' including older range with mullioned and transomed windows. Two wings burnt down in 1922. A painting of Henrietta Nelson at the hall is said to be haunted, and has recently been returned to display after an absence of nearly a century.

Yaxley Manor, built for John Fanner in 1520, is of timber frame construction, clad in brickwork.  It is a Grade II* listed building.

Bull's Hall is named after William de Bulle, owner in 1328; the present timber-framed and jettied building dates from 1570.

References

External links

Parish Council website
Yaxley Hall website
Yaxley Church at suffolkchurhes.co.uk
Yaxley Doom at paintedchurch.org
Sexton's Wheel at geograph.org.uk
Medieval glass at geograph.org.uk
Yaxley Manor
Bull's Hall at britishlistedbuildings.co.uk

Villages in Suffolk
Mid Suffolk District
Civil parishes in Suffolk